List of programs broadcast by ABC may refer to:
List of programs broadcast by American Broadcasting Company
List of programs broadcast by ABC Television, program lists of Australian Broadcasting Corporation